In abelian group theory, an abelian group is said to be cotorsion if every extension of it by a torsion-free group splits. It suffices to check the condition for  the group of rational numbers.

More generally, a module M over a ring R is said to be a cotorsion module if Ext1(F,M)=0 for all flat modules F. This is equivalent to the definition for abelian groups (considered as modules over the ring Z of integers) because over Z flat modules are the same as torsion-free modules. 

Some properties of cotorsion groups:

 Any quotient of a cotorsion group is cotorsion.
 A direct product of groups is cotorsion if and only if each factor is.
 Every divisible group or injective group is cotorsion.
 The Baer Fomin Theorem states that a torsion group is cotorsion if and only if it is a direct sum of a divisible group and a bounded group, that is, a group of bounded exponent.
 A torsion-free abelian group is cotorsion if and only if it is algebraically compact.
 Ulm subgroups of cotorsion groups are cotorsion and Ulm factors of cotorsion groups are algebraically compact.

External links

Abelian group theory
Properties of groups